Welcome to Wonderland is a feature documentary film, by director James Short, about music and dance. Released on DVD in June 2006 after more than five years in the making, this film explores Australia's vibrant outdoor bush rave party scene through the thoughts of participants.

The trance scene in Melbourne, Australia, is considered one of the best in the world,  and sees the convergence of travellers from all parts of the globe, especially Japan and Israel. With party organisations like Rainbow Serpent and Earthcore there are as many as 10,000 people who come together to celebrate and dance. The film follows the party lives of characters: Matty, Krusty, Lauire, Margaret, Raff, and Holly.

Film Festivals
 Official Selection of the Hungary Mediawave Film Festival - 2007
 Official Selection of the Bryon Bay Film Festival - 2007

References

External links
 
UEP Online Store DVD Distributor of Welcome to Wonderland DVD - available to purchase online
www.welcometowonderland.com Official website of the Welcome to Wonderland documentary.

Australian documentary films
Direct-to-video documentary films
Documentary films about dance
Documentary films about electronic music and musicians
2006 films
2006 documentary films
2000s English-language films